The article's name is transliterated in accordance to the official and academical romanization of Ukrainian.

Chonhar, transliterated sometimes as Chongar, is a village in Henichesk Raion, Kherson Oblast, which is located on the Chonhar peninsula within the swampy region of Syvash. The village is a seat of the Chonhar rural community (silrada). It belongs to Henichesk urban hromada, one of the hromadas of Ukraine.

History

On 27 February 2014 during the 2014 Crimean crisis Crimean Berkut occupied the checkpoint near Chonhar and neighbouring territory. After the Russian annexation of Crimea to the area became a de facto border patrolled by Berkut and Russian troops. By 27 December 2014 Russian forces had fully withdrawn from Chonhar Peninsula.

See also
Strilkove

References

External links
 Russians enter town north of Crimea, say Ukrainians. Fox News
 The murder of the Jews of Chonhar during World War II, at Yad Vashem website.

Villages in Henichesk Raion
Russia–Ukraine border crossings
Holocaust locations in Ukraine